General Whitaker may refer to:

Denis Whitaker (1915–2001), Canadian Army brigadier general
Walter C. Whitaker (1823–1887), Union Army brigadier general and brevet major general
Robert Whittaker (British Army officer) (1894–1967), British Army major general

See also
Attorney General Whitaker (disambiguation)